Ultra. Hits is a mixed dance music compilation album mixed by David Waxman from Ultra Records. The album contains a collection of the most popular songs of the previous year.

Track listing 
"All Of The Above" - Maino feat. T-Pain
"Echo (Remix)" - Gorilla Zoe feat. Diddy
"Because Of You" - Ne-Yo
"I Know You Want Me (Calle Ocho)" - Pitbull
"Breakin' Dishes" - Rihanna
"I'm The Ish" - DJ Class
"Move (If You Wanna)" - Mims
"My President" - Young Jeezy feat. Nas
"Stanky Legg" - GS Boyz
"Make tha Trap Say Aye" - OJ Da Juiceman feat. Gucci Mane
"I Run" - Slim Thug feat. Yelawolf
"Hot Music" - Remedy feat. Da Pounders
"Boyfriend #2 (The Council Remix)" - Pleasure P
"Took The Night" - Chelley
"Beware Of The Boys (Mundian To Bach Ke) (Aaron LaCrate & Debonair Samir B-More Gutter Alternate Version)" - Panjabi MC
"Whine" - Enur feat. Beenie Man & Natalie Storm
"She Came Along" - Sharam feat. Kid Cudi

References

External links

2009 compilation albums
Dance-pop compilation albums
Ultra Records albums